The Northerns cricket team was a first-class cricket team in Zimbabwe. They competed in the Logan Cup from 2006 to 2009. The club mostly played their home matches at the Harare Sports Club, with some hosted at the Alexandra Sports Club.

First-class record

References 

Former senior cricket clubs in Zimbabwe
Former Zimbabwean first-class cricket teams
Cricket teams in Zimbabwe